Sir Cyril Norman Hinshelwood  (19 June 1897 – 9 October 1967) was a British physical chemist and expert in chemical kinetics. His work in reaction mechanisms earned the 1956 Nobel Prize in chemistry.

Education
Born in London, his parents were Norman Macmillan Hinshelwood, a chartered accountant, and Ethel Frances née Smith. He was educated first in Canada, returning in 1905 on the death of his father to a small flat in Chelsea where he lived for the rest of his life. He then studied at Westminster City School and Balliol College, Oxford.

Career
During the First World War, Hinshelwood was a chemist in an explosives factory. He was a tutor at Trinity College, Oxford, from 1921 to 1937 and was Dr Lee's Professor of Chemistry at the University of Oxford from 1937. He served on several advisory councils on scientific matters to the British Government.

His early studies of molecular kinetics led to the publication of Thermodynamics for Students of Chemistry and The Kinetics of Chemical Change in 1926. With Harold Warris Thompson he studied the explosive reaction of hydrogen and oxygen and described the phenomenon of chain reaction. His subsequent work on chemical changes in the bacterial cell proved to be of great importance in later research work on antibiotics and therapeutic agents, and his book, The Chemical Kinetics of the Bacterial Cell was published in 1946, followed by Growth, Function and Regulation in Bacterial Cells in 1966. In 1951 he published The Structure of Physical Chemistry. It was republished as an Oxford Classic Texts in the Physical Sciences by Oxford University Press in 2005.

The Langmuir-Hinshelwood process in heterogeneous catalysis, in which the adsorption of the reactants on the surface is the rate-limiting step, is named after him. He was a senior research fellow at Imperial College London from 1964 to 1967.

Awards and honours
In addition to being named the second  at Oxford, Hinshelwood was elected Fellow of the Royal Society (FRS) in 1929, serving as president from 1955 to 1960. He was knighted in 1948 and appointed to the Order of Merit in 1960. With Nikolay Semenov of the USSR, Hinshelwood was jointly awarded the Nobel Prize in Chemistry in 1956 for his researches into the mechanism of chemical reactions. He was also an elected member of the American Academy of Arts and Sciences, the United States National Academy of Sciences, and the American Philosophical Society.

Hinshelwood was president of the Chemical Society, the Royal Society, the Classical Association, and the Faraday Society, and received numerous awards and honorary degrees.

Personal life
Hinshelwood never married. He was fluent in seven classical and modern languages and his main hobbies were painting, collecting Chinese pottery, and foreign literature. As an artist, Hinshelwood painted scenes in Oxford, as well as portraits of Oxford University people including Harold Hartley, his doctoral supervisor, and Herbert Blakiston, the President of Trinity College. The portrait of Hartley is now owned by the Royal Society, and that of Blakiston is owned by Trinity College, as are a number of Hinshelwood's other paintings.

He died, at home, on 9 October 1967. In 1968 his Nobel Prize medal was sold by his estate to a collector, who then sold it in 1976 for $15,000. In 2017 his Nobel Prize medal was sold at auction for $128,000.

See also
 Balliol-Trinity Laboratories
 List of presidents of the Royal Society

References

External links 
  including the Nobel Lecture on 11 December 1956 Chemical Kinetics in the Past Few Decades

1897 births
1967 deaths
Scientists from London
English physical chemists
Knights Bachelor
Nobel laureates in Chemistry
British Nobel laureates
Fellows of the Royal Society
Presidents of the Royal Society
Alumni of Balliol College, Oxford
Fellows of Trinity College, Oxford
Members of the Order of Merit
Recipients of the Copley Medal
People educated at Westminster City School
Royal Medal winners
Faraday Lecturers
Presidents of the British Science Association
Foreign Members of the USSR Academy of Sciences
English Nobel laureates
Dr Lee's Professors of Chemistry
Academics of Imperial College London
Foreign associates of the National Academy of Sciences
Recipients of the Dalton Medal
Manchester Literary and Philosophical Society
Members of the American Philosophical Society
Presidents of the Classical Association